In Greek mythology, Canopus or Canobus (Ancient Greek: Κάνωβος) was the pilot of the ship of King Menelaus of Sparta during the Trojan War.

Mythology 
Canopus is described as a handsome young man who was loved by the Egyptian prophetess, Theonoe, but never reciprocated her feelings. 

According to legend, while visiting the Egyptian coast, Canopus was bitten by a serpent and died.  His master, Menelaus, erected a monument to him at one of the mouths of the River Nile, around which the town of Canopus later developed.

Legacy 
Also named for Canopus is Canopus, the brightest star in the southern constellation of Carina (the keel of the ship Argo), and the second-brightest star in the night sky, after Sirius.

Notes

References 

 Conon, Fifty Narrations, surviving as one-paragraph summaries in the Bibliotheca (Library) of Photius, Patriarch of Constantinople translated from the Greek by Brady Kiesling. Online version at the Topos Text Project.
 Strabo, The Geography of Strabo. Edition by H.L. Jones. Cambridge, Mass.: Harvard University Press; London: William Heinemann, Ltd. 1924. Online version at the Perseus Digital Library.
 Strabo, Geographica edited by A. Meineke. Leipzig: Teubner. 1877. Greek text available at the Perseus Digital Library.

Achaeans (Homer)
Laconian mythology
Canopus